Kirna may refer to:

The Kirna (locally known as Kirna House, previously Grangehill), a villa in Walkerburn, Scottish Borders, Scotland
Kırna, a village and municipality in Julfa Rayon, Nakhchivan, Azerbaijan
Kirna, Järva County, a village in Türi Parish, Järva County, Estonia
Kirna, Lääne County, a village in Martna Parish, Lääne County, Estonia
Kirna, Rapla County, a village in Märjamaa Parish, Rapla County, Estonia